Eskbank is a railway station on the Borders Railway, which runs between  and . It is owned by Network Rail and managed by ScotRail.

History
The original Eskbank and Dalkeith railway station was previously closed (along with the Waverley Route) in 1969. The new construction work was undertaken by BAM Nuttall. The new station, further south than the original, opened on 6 September 2015.

Facilities
Car parking space is available for 248 cars and also cycle storage space.

Services

As of the May 2021 timetable change, the station is served by an hourly service between Edinburgh Waverley and Tweedbank, with a half-hourly service operating at peak times (Monday to Saturday). Some peak time trains continue to Glenrothes with Thornton. All services are operated by ScotRail.

Rolling stock used: Class 158 Express Sprinter and Class 170 Turbostar

Notes

References

External links
 
 

Borders Railway
Railway stations in Midlothian
Railway stations opened by Network Rail
Railway stations in Great Britain opened in 1849
Railway stations in Great Britain closed in 1969
Beeching closures in Scotland
Railway stations in Great Britain opened in 2015
Railway stations served by ScotRail
Reopened railway stations in Great Britain
1969 disestablishments in Scotland
2015 establishments in Scotland
Dalkeith